Barry Horowitz (born March 24, 1959) is an American professional wrestler, best known for his time in the World Wrestling Federation (WWF).

Early life
Horowitz attended Florida State University, where he studied sports nutrition and wrestled.

Professional wrestling career

Early career (19791987)
Horowitz trained as a professional wrestler under Boris Malenko in Tampa, Florida for 18 months and debuted in 1979 on the Floridian independent circuit. He went on to work for the World Wide Wrestling Federation, Jim Crockett, Sr.'s NWA Mid-Atlantic promotion, and promotions in Canada and Puerto Rico. His first television appearance in the WWWF/WWF was in October 1981 as an enhancement talent named Barry Hart, losing to King Kong Mosca.

Horowitz eventually joined Championship Wrestling from Florida as Jack Hart. On July 23, 1985, in Tampa, he defeated Mike Graham in a tournament final to win the vacant NWA Florida Heavyweight Championship. He held the title until September 2, 1985, when he lost to Kendall Windham. He remained in CWF for two years, and was managed by heels such as Percy Pringle and Sir Oliver Humperdink.

World Wrestling Federation (19871990)
Horowitz joined the World Wrestling Federation in 1987. Wearing suspenders and a vest with an outline of a handprint on the back, which he patted as a self-congratulatory measure, he spent three years in the WWF as an enhancement talent (primarily against up and coming babyfaces). Horowitz occasionally teamed with another preliminary wrestler, Steve Lombardi (the "Brooklyn Brawler"). Although Horowitz's win years later over BodyDonna Skip was viewed as his first victory, he did have multiple pinfall victories during his first WWF run. The first was in Kitchener, Ontario, on July 22, 1987, over Brady Boone. That year he would gain three more victories, pinning Lanny Poffo, David Sammartino, and Jerry Allen. Horowitz also gained multiple wins in tag-team action as he partnered with Lombardi. In one house show event, Horowitz and Lombardi defeated Jerry Allen and Scott Hall in Springfield, Massachusetts on August 23, 1987. They also defeated the team of Lanny Poffo and Scott Casey on January 26, 1988, in Hershey, Pennsylvania. The match would later air on an episode of Primetime Wrestling on February 19, 1988.

In 1988, he registered fifteen singles victories, defeating Allen, DJ Peterson, Jose Luis Rivera, Mike Sharpe, and Poffo. Horowitz finished his initial WWF run registering fourteen victories in 1989, including an improbable pin over a young Ken Shamrock in Greensboro, North Carolina, on July 29. Barry's final match was a loss to Mark Young in Waco, Texas on April 22, 1990, after which he departed for World Championship Wrestling.

World Championship Wrestling (1990)
Horowitz made his debut in WCW a little over a month later at a TV taping on May 23, 1990 at the Georgia Mountains Center in a match with Brian Pillman. He would wrestle in over fifty matches that year, registering one victory (a pinfall of Tommy Angel at a TV taping in October). His only pay-per-view appearance was in a dark match at Halloween Havoc, where he was defeated by Tim Horner. His last appearance came on December 7 at a house show in St. Joseph, Missouri, where he wrestled twice, losing to The Juicer and Sam Houston in subsequent matches.

Global Wrestling Federation (1991–1993)
Horowitz then traveled to Texas, where he worked for the newly formed Global Wrestling Federation. Competing in the light-heavyweight division, Horowitz (billed as Barry "the Winner" Horowitz) won the GWF Light Heavyweight Championship on two occasions within the space of a month in 1992, defeating Jerry Lynn on February 7 and Ben Jordan on February 28 in Dallas, Texas. He remained in the GWF for two years until it declared bankruptcy.

Return to WWF

Jobber to the stars (1991–1995) 
Along the way, Horowitz also returned to the WWF in late 1991, where he was once again used to help put talent over. His first match back came on October 21 at a WWF Superstars taping in Fort Wayne, Indiana, when he teamed with Brian Costello to face The Bushwhackers. For the remainder of 1991, Horowitz only appeared on televised events and came out on the losing end in matches against Legion of Doom, Greg Valentine, and then Intercontinental champion Bret Hart. This continued through the first half of 1992, and Horowitz would face and lose to Kerry Von Erich, Owen Hart, Tito Santana, and others at WWF Superstars and WWF Challenge tapings.

On June 5, 1992 in Chicago, Illinois, Horowitz rejoined the house show circuit, substituting for the departed Colonel Mustafa in a series against Kerry Von Erich. He also faced Tito Santana, coming out winless on each occasion. In September he began teaming with Skinner in a house show program against High Energy (Koko B. Ware and Owen Hart). Horowitz would remain winless in his WWF return until September 21, 1992, when he finally secured his first pinfall victory by defeating Brad Holman in a dark match at a WWF Superstars taping in Winnipeg, Manitoba. It would be his only victory of the year.

In Phoenix, Arizona he teamed with Reno Riggins against The Smoking Guns on April 5, 1993 in the WWF debut of The Smoking Gunns. Horowitz would later lose to Riggins in a Wrestling Challenge dark match on June 14 in Columbus, Ohio. On July 5, 1993 he gained his second victory, defeating Phil Apollo at a Monday Night Raw taping, then followed it up two days later by pinning Chuck Williams in a dark match taping at Wrestling Challenge. After several more losses, Horowitz appeared at SummerSlam when he lost to Owen Hart in a dark match. A month later, Horowitz gained another pair of victories in television dark matches, defeating Mike Davis and Scott Taylor. In November Horowitz made his pay-per-view debut under a mask at the 1993 Survivor Series as the Red Knight, teaming with Shawn Michaels (who was substituting for Jerry Lawler) and the Black and Blue Knights to lose to Bret, Owen, Keith, and Bruce Hart. Following the pay-per-view, Horowitz began teaming with his old partner, Lombardi, as The Red and Black Knights on the house show circuit, losing to Men on a Mission multiple times in December.

Despite his status as a jobber, Horowitz would occasionally wrestle in matches of greater prominence. He was instrumental in starting the feud between reigning tag team champions, The Quebecers, and the “1-2-3” Kid. The Quebecers were set to defend their titles against Horowitz and Riggins, but Horowitz brought in the Kid as a last-minute replacement partner. Though the Quebecers prevailed in the match, the Kid would continue to challenge for the tag team titles, albeit with changing partners and without Horowitz. Horowitz would return to teaming with Riggins during 1994, facing The Smoking Gunns and Men on a Mission on multiple occasions. Despite numerous defeats, Horowitz did gain two victories in 1994 by defeating Ben Jordan and Mark Thomas. He also faced Thurman "Sparky" Plugg in the latter's first WWF match.

Horowitz entered 1995 still mired in the preliminary ranks and lost to Chris Candido in the soon to be BodyDonna Skip's first match. However, Bodydonna Skip was the catalyst for a career turnaround that summer. Horowitz's schedule began to pick up and he wrestled Henry Godwinn, Mantaur, Shawn Michaels, and others. On the March 13, 1995 episode of Monday Night Raw, Horowitz received a shot at Jeff Jarrett's Intercontinental Championship. It was a competitive match, but Horowitz lost via submission to Jarrett's figure-four leg lock. On May 25, 1995 in Manitoba he began a house show series against Skip of the Body Donnas, losing to him all seven times.

Elevation to main roster and teaming with Hakushi (1995–1997) 
Finally, on the July 9, 1995 airing of Wrestling Challenge, Horowitz received the first push of his WWF career, beginning with pinning Bodydonna Skip to gain his first win over a WWF star on television, leading to commentator Jim Ross shouting "Horowitz beat him!" into his microphone in disbelief. Horowitz faced Skip on the August 5 episode of WWF Superstars after the Body Donna said that Horowitz could not last ten minutes in a match. Horowitz avoided a pinfall for the ten minutes, leading to a third televised match between them at SummerSlam 1995. Horowitz won this encounter, gaining his first ever pay-per-view victory. These wins led to Horowitz becoming a popular underdog with WWF fans. During this time, the WWF played up Horowitz's Jewish heritage, introducing a Star of David on his wrestling trunks and making his entrance theme an upbeat version of the Jewish folk song "Hava Nagila". The character was also developed with the portrayal of Horowitz as a stereotypical nerd when not wrestling, showing Horowitz with large glasses, dress shirts buttoned up all the way, and a pocket protector. Horowitz formed a tag team with the newly turned face Hakushi–whom he attempted to Americanize (as shown in a series of vignettes with Horowitz describing American culture and institutions to Hakushi) after beating him in another upset. At the 1995 Survivor Series, they teamed with Bob Holly and Marty Jannetty in a loss to Skip, Rad Radford, Tom Prichard, and The 1-2-3 Kid. A month later at In Your House 5 Horowitz teamed with Hakushi and The Smoking Gunns to defeat The Body Donnas, Yokozuna, and Isaac Yankem in a dark match at the pay-per-view. He closed out the year teaming frequently with Fatu and Hakushi and coming out victorious over Skip, Kama, and Yankem on the house show circuit.

Horowitz appeared in the 1996 Royal Rumble match, as the 25th entrant, where he was eliminated by Owen Hart. However, despite his elevation in the roster, Horowitz quickly returned to a long losing streak, being defeated by Stone Cold Steve Austin, Hunter Hearst Helmsley, Duke Droese, and Savio Vega in January and February. He rebounded to defeat Isaac Yankem (Kane) in Hartford, Connecticut on March 15, but then entered another losing streak that would not end until May 28, when he upset Owen Hart after the referee reversed the decision. Horowitz then went on another long streak, falling to Faarooq, Goldust, and Salvatore Sincere. His final televised match came on April 7, 1997 when he teamed with Freddie Joe Floyd against The Headbangers on Monday Night Raw. His last WWF match was in Kuwait City, Kuwait on April 12, 1997 against Floyd.

Return to WCW (1997–2000)
Horowitz's contract was not renewed by the WWF in 1997, and he joined World Championship Wrestling in October 1997, wrestling Disco Inferno on WCW Saturday Night. He signed a two-year contract and wrestled primarily on Saturday Night, but also had numerous house show appearances. He sustained losses to Disco Inferno, Wrath, Chris Adams, Alex Wright, Vincent, and others during 1998. He was also part of Bill Goldberg's undefeated streak, losing to him on January 10, 1998 on WCW Saturday Night and later on May 27, 1998 on WCW Thunder - where he had his first and only shot at the WCW United States Championship. On January 17, 1998 on WCW WorldWide, he beat Hardbody Harrison. On October 20, 1998, Horowitz gained his second victory in his WCW return (albeit via disqualification) in a match against Barry Darsow at a television taping in Mankato, Minnesota. On November 22, 1998 he made his first pay-per-view appearance, wrestling in the three ring, 60 man battle royal at World War 3.

In early 2000, he began his first feud in WCW after losing to Allan Funk on the March 11 edition of Saturday Night. Funk defeated Horowitz using a handful of tights. A week later on Saturday Night during a match between Fidel Sierra and Funk, Horowitz came out to the ring and distracted Funk, allowing Sierra to win. Horowitz's final WCW appearance came at the last ever taping of Saturday Night on March 29, 2000 in Beaumont, Texas. He faced Jim Duggan and was defeated after Funk interfered.

He then left WCW in 2000 and returned to the independent circuit.

Return to professional wrestling (2022-2023)

After not wrestling since 2013, Horowitz returned to the ring on March 19, 2022 to face Joey Janela at the WrestlePro Rock And Roll Forever event in Rahway, New Jersey. The match was billed as a Rahway street fight. Horowitz was victorious in the match. Later that month, Horowitz wrestled at the WrestleCon Mark Hitchcock Memorial Super Show in Dallas teaming with Dango, Jimmy Wang Yang, nZo, and PCO in a losing effort against Atsushi Onita, Robert Gibson, Ricky Morton, Juice Robinson, and Colt Cabana.

On May 11, 2022 Horowitz appeared in a vignette in All Elite Wrestling in a parody of Dark Side of the Ring in the build-up to the match between MJF and Wardlow. During the vignette, Horowitz (billed as a "Legendary Jewish Wrestler") defended fellow Jewish wrestler MJF while poking fun at himself by saying he's a top star and calling Shawn Dean (who had two disqualification victories over MJF) "a jobber".

On the episode of Impact Wrestling that aired on February 16, 2023, Horowitz wrestled Johnny Swinger as part of Swinger's quest to get 50 victories. After a distraction by The KISS Demon, Horowitz rolled Swinger up for a pinfall victory. Later in the show, Horowitz teased a shot at the World title if he got 50 victories like the one promised to Swinger but when Impact Director of Authority Santino Marella said his next opponent would be against Rhino, Horowitz decided he wanted to take his one victory and leave on top.

Popular culture
Horowitz is the subject of a song by rapper Action Bronson, though Horowitz was angered by this and indicated that Bronson did not get permission to use his name or likeness.

Championships and accomplishments
Border City Wrestling
BCW Can-Am Tag Team Championship (1 time) – with Otis Apollo
Catch Wrestling Association
CWA World Middleweight Championship (1 time)
Championship Wrestling from Florida
NWA Florida Heavyweight Championship (1 time)
NWA Florida Heavyweight Title Tournament (1995)
Continental Wrestling Association
AWA Southern Tag Team Championship (1 time) – with Chick Donovan
Definitive Wrestling International
Malenko Memorial Cup (2013)
Empire Wrestling Alliance
EWA Heavyweight Championship (1 time)
Future of Wrestling
FOW Hardcore Championship (2 times)
Global Wrestling Federation
GWF Light Heavyweight Championship (2 times)
Independent Association of Wrestling
IAW Heavyweight Championship (2 times)
IWA Intercontinental Championship (1 time)
International Wrestling Association
IWA United States Heavyweight Championship (1 time)
Mid-Eastern Wrestling Federation
MEWF Mid-Atlantic Championship (1 time)
New Breed Pro Wrestling
NBPW United States Heavyweight Championship (1 time)
Pro Wrestling Illustrated
Most Inspirational Wrestler of the Year (1995)
Ranked No. 114 of the top 500 singles wrestlers in the PWI 500 in 1992
South Eastern Championship Wrestling
SECW Heavyweight Championship (1 time)
SECW Television Championship (1 time)
Other titles
RISE Heavyweight Championship (1 time)

See also
List of Jewish professional wrestlers

References

External links
Accelerator3359.com profile

Online World of Wrestling profile 

1959 births
20th-century professional wrestlers
21st-century professional wrestlers
21st-century American Jews
American male professional wrestlers
Florida State University alumni
Jewish American sportspeople
Jewish professional wrestlers
Living people
Masked wrestlers
Sportspeople from St. Petersburg, Florida
GWF Light Heavyweight Champions
NWA Florida Heavyweight Champions